Granadilla is a flowering plant species of genus Passiflora, or the fruit of these plants (passion fruit). It is often confused with passion fruit, and the term often refers specifically to the fruit of Passiflora ligularis, although other species such as the Passiflora quadrangularis (giant granadilla) are included.

Granadilla may also refer to:

 Atlético Granadilla, a football club in Granadilla de Abona
 Granadilla de Abona, a municipality of Tenerife in the Canary Islands
 UD Granadilla Tenerife, a Spanish women's football club based in Granadilla de Abona
 Granadilla, Spain, a ghost town in Extremadura

See also
 Granada (disambiguation)
 Granadillo (disambiguation)
 Grenadilla (Dalbergia melanoxylon), a flowering plant in the family Fabaceae
 La Granadella, a town in the autonomous community of Catalonia in northeast Spain